Bala Dasteh-ye Rakan Kola (also Romanized as Bālā Dasteh-ye Rakan Kolā; also known as Bālā Dasteh) is a village in Kiakola Rural District, in the Central District of Simorgh County, Mazandaran Province, Iran. At the 2006 census, its population was 1,190, in 328 families.

References 

Populated places in Simorgh County